Orothalassodes falsaria is a species of moth of the  family Geometridae. It is found in north-eastern India, Sri Lanka, China, Peninsular Malaysia, Sumatra, Borneo, Java and Bali. Records from Taiwan are misidentifications of Orothalassodes pervulgatus.

Description
Antennae shaft brown, whereas rami greenish.

References

Moths described in 1912
Hemitheini